Netherlands Antilles first entered the competition at the 1994 games in Valencia, Venezuela and have participated in all but one edition in 1998.

The Netherlands Antilles usually send the smallest delegations at the games but have still managed to get a total of seven gold medals in only four editions.

Medal count

Medals by games

See also
South American Games

External links
 South American Sports Organization Official Site

South American Games